The Halltown Colored Free School in Halltown, West Virginia was built in 1870 to educate children from the African-American community in Halltown.  The school was racially segregated from local schools for whites, in accordance with the laws of the time.  It functioned in that capacity until 1929, when it was converted to a residence.

The school is to the left and behind the Halltown Union Colored Sunday School, and is owned by the same community organization.

It was listed on the National Register of Historic Places in 2004.

References

External links

Neoclassical architecture in West Virginia
Defunct schools in West Virginia
Former school buildings in the United States
Houses in Jefferson County, West Virginia
Houses on the National Register of Historic Places in West Virginia
Historically segregated African-American schools in West Virginia
National Register of Historic Places in Jefferson County, West Virginia
School buildings completed in 1870
Schools in Jefferson County, West Virginia
School buildings on the National Register of Historic Places in West Virginia